The Deputy Minister of Foreign Affairs is a non-Malaysian cabinet position serving as deputy head of the Ministry of Foreign Affairs.

The Ministry of External Affairs was created in 1956 with the Independence of Malaya looming. It was not until 1965 when the ministry was renamed the Ministry of Foreign Affairs and relocated from the Sultan Abdul Samad Building in Kuala Lumpur to Wisma Putra in Putrajaya. Nevertheless, the position of deputy minister was only created in 1979 with only a full minister at the helm of the ministry previously.

List of Deputy Ministers 
The following individuals have been appointed as Deputy Minister of Foreign Affairs, or any of its precedent titles:

Colour key (for political coalition/parties):

See also 
 Minister of Foreign Affairs (Malaysia)

References 

Ministry of Foreign Affairs (Malaysia)